Katrin Petersmann (born 19 July 1967) is a German rower. She competed in the women's eight event at the 1988 Summer Olympics.

References

1967 births
Living people
German female rowers
Olympic rowers of West Germany
Rowers at the 1988 Summer Olympics
Place of birth missing (living people)